The 7th European Men's and Women's Artistic Gymnastics Individual Championships were held from 19 to 23 April 2017 at the Polyvalent Hall in Cluj-Napoca, Romania. As usual in this format, no team competitions took place.

Medalists

Medal table

Combined

Men

Women

Men's results

Individual all-around

Floor

Pommel horse

Rings

Vault

Parallel bars

Horizontal bar

Women's results

Individual all-around

Vault

Uneven bars

Balance beam

Floor

Qualification

Women's results

Individual all-around

Vault

Uneven bars

Balance beam

Floor

References

External links 
 

European Artistic Gymnastics Championships
European Artistic Gymnastics Championships
Gymnastics
2017 in Romanian sport
International gymnastics competitions hosted by Romania
Sport in Cluj-Napoca
European Artistic Gymnastics Championships